Valleton is an unincorporated community in Monterey County, California.

The Valleton post office operated from 1887 to 1918, having moved in 1901.

References

Unincorporated communities in California
Unincorporated communities in Monterey County, California